Capital City Green was the branding of the bus service 27 Cardiff, operated by Cardiff Bus. The route ran from the city centre to the north of the city, serving the Maindy, Mynachdy, Birchgrove, Heath, Llanishen and Thornhill districts.

The service formed part of the wider Cardiff Bus network and was one of three services to have a unique branding, along with Baycar and Capital City Red.

The upgraded service was introduced in 2007 when Cardiff Bus deployed on the route six out of 15 new Scania OmniCity vehicles which it had purchased at a cost of £2.5 million.

History
Prior to the 1940s, Cardiff trams ran as far north as Gabalfa from the city centre. The trams were replaced with Cardiff trolleybuses in the 1940s until the 1960s when the transition to motor buses began and was completed by 1970. At the time, routes to areas in the west of Cardiff such as Caerau and Culverhouse Cross carried the number 27. Birchgrove and Llanishen were served by the 28(B) and Thornhill by the 29, which still exist today, running on a different route the 27, making the 27 a newer route.

Vehicles
The Scania OmniCity vehicles had their own two tone green livery, equipped with seats with leather headrests, air-conditioning, reserved spaces for buggies and wheelchairs, CCTV, on-bus screens with local travel information and BBC News 24 bulletins, hearing induction loop and next stop information. When introduced, the backs of six of the vehicles featured images and stories of regular commuters.

Route

The 12.1 mile long route circles the city centre anti-clockwise before heading north past the Civic Centre and Cathays railway station, through Maindy, Heath, Birchgrove. It passes through Thornhill and Llanishen in a clockwise route and returns south to the city centre via Blackweir instead of Cathays.

Amongst the place served (from south to north) are:
Cardiff Castle
Millennium Stadium
The Hayes
Cardiff Central Library
Cardiff International Arena
Cardiff Queen Street railway station
Capitol Centre
Cathays Park (National Museum Cardiff)
Cathays railway station
Cardiff University
Birchgrove railway station
Thornhill Crematorium

During city centre closures on Friday and Saturday nights, the route does not circle the city centre, but instead operates directly between The Hayes and Queen Street Station, not stopping at Kingsway, Dumfries Place or Westgate Street.

See also
Baycar
Bus transport in Cardiff
Transport in Cardiff

References

External links
Capital City Green route map and timetable
Cardiff Bus website 

Transport in Cardiff
Bus transport in Wales
Bus transport in Cardiff
Bus routes in Wales